Hong Kong Resort Company Limited is a joint venture between HKR International and CITIC Pacific. It is best known for the Discovery Bay development, on Lantau Island, Hong Kong.

History
Hong Kong Resort Co. Limited was incorporated in 1973.

Until 1994, Hong Kong Resort was a wholly owned subsidiary of HKR International Ltd.  CITIC Pacific acquired a 50% interest that year.

External links
 HKR International Ltd
 CITIC Pacific

1973 establishments in Hong Kong
Real estate companies established in 1973
HKR International
Real estate companies of Hong Kong